The Metropolitan School District of Pike Township is a school district in the northwestern portion of Marion County, Indianapolis, Indiana, United States. Founded in 1937 for grades K-12, the district is relatively diverse, with a 91.1% nonwhite student population, with over 400 international students who represent 41 different countries and speak 50 languages.

The district has nine elementary schools, three middle schools, one high school, and one alternative learning school. The average student/teacher ratio is 17 to 1 in academic classrooms. It maintains a 94% graduation rate at the high school level, with nearly 64% proceeding to post-secondary education. Four of its schools—Fishback, New Augusta South, New Augusta North, and Eagle Creek—are year-round schools. The high school, Pike High School, is an International Baccalaureate school as of 2004, and boasts a Freshman Center, opening the same year.

Current district staff
Superintendent of Schools: Dr. Flora J. Reichanadter
Asst. Superintendent of Secondary Education: Dr. Maggie Bishop
Asst. Superintendent of Elementary Education: Dr. Larry D. Young
Chief Financial Officer: Linda Searles
Director of Community and Student Services: Patricia Burton
Director of School Facilities and Security: Raul Rivas
Director of Human Resources: Eric Parquet
Director of Information Services: Todd Riker
Director of Purchasing: Dave Koch
Director of Security: Allen Kasper
Director of Special Education: Jill Slavin
Director of Instruction and Professional Development: Mary Kay Hunt
Director of Curriculum and Programs: Cynthia Huffman
Director of Transportation: David Holly
District Athletic Director:

High schools
 Pike High School

Middle schools
Guion Creek Middle School
Lincoln Middle School
New Augusta Public Academy North

Elementary schools
Central Elementary School
College Park Elementary School
Deer Run Elementary School
Eagle Creek Elementary School
Eastbrook Elementary School
Fishback Creek Public Academy
Guion Creek Elementary School
New Augusta Public Academy South
Snacks Crossing Elementary School

Other schools
Cooperative Achievement Program

External links 

 

Pike Township
Education in Indianapolis
School districts established in 1937
1937 establishments in Indiana